The Mint Museum of Toys  is a purpose-built museum showing a private collection of vintage toys. It was officially opened on March 5, 2007, and officiated by the Minister for Foreign Affairs, Mr George Yeo. The museum is located at 26 Seah Street, in the Arts & Heritage district of Singapore. MINT is an acronym for "Moment of Imagination and Nostalgia with Toys".

Background
The museum collection includes more than 50,000 toys and childhood memorabilia from the mid-19th century to mid-20th Century. All the toys displayed in the museum are the lifetime collection of Singaporean, Chang Yang Fa, an alumnus of St Andrew's School.

Exhibits on display include Disneyana toys, Astro Boy, Batman, Bonzo the Dog, Dan Dare, Popeye the Sailor, Pre-war Japanese toys, including a 'Door of Hope' Chinese doll collection dating from the turn of the 20th century, Teddy Bear collection as well as Chinese comics and comic covers dating from 1920s, and The Adventures of Tintin collectables.

The museum's collection includes a large collection of enamel signs and tin boxes which are displayed in the museum's restaurant and wine bar.

Architecture 
The collection is housed within a five-storey contemporary building designed by Chan Soo Khian, Principal Architect of SCDA Architects and Structural Engineers Web Structures. The building has garnered international awards including The Chicago Athenaeum, Museum of Architecture and Design “International Architecture Awards” 2007 and was Runners Up in the Commercial Building Category for the Cityscape Architectural Review Award, held on 4 December 2006, at Cityscape Dubai 2006. The museum was awarded the 2007 International Architectural Award for Best New Global Design by the Chicago Athenaeum.

The window-less building prevents UV-rays from reaching the exhibits; the shelves are fitted with LED lights; shelvings are designed such that no shadows are cast on the exhibits. The building's signature facade, which is made up of 26 glass panes shaped into a wavelike structure, gives the museum an iconic status in Singapore's urban landscape.

External links
 Mint Museum of Toys website

Reference

Toy museums
2007 establishments in Singapore
Museums in Singapore